Nova Jones is a British musical science-fiction television series which airs on CBBC, created by Helen Serafinowicz. It focuses on the adventures of the titular galactic pop singer, portrayed by Molly Rainford. It began broadcast on 22 September 2021. It has since been renewed for a second and third series.

Cast
 Molly Rainford as Nova Jones
 Grace Barkley as McLaren Jones
 David Byrne as Sid
 John Lynn as Captain of the North
 Katie Davies as Jefferson Ship (Voice)
 Faye Stedman Shannon as Chef Din Dins (Jingle Voice)

Episodes

Series 1

Series 2

References

External links
 Nova Jones at BBC Online
 

2021 British television series debuts
2020s British science fiction television series
BBC children's television shows
BBC high definition shows
British children's science fiction television series
English-language television shows